is a private university in Kurashiki, Japan, established in April 1970.

History 
1938 - Dr.Kawasaki Sukenobu established "Showa hospital" in Okayama
1950 - "Showa hospital" became "Kawasaki Hospital"
1952 - Established "Asahigawa sō"(welfare facilities) in Okayama
1968 - Establishment of Medical school is authorized by Ministry of Welfare
 1970 - Establishment of University
 1976 - Establishment of Graduate school
 1977 - Made affiliations with sister schools with University of Minnesota
 1979 - Emergency room is set up
 1982 - Made affiliations with sister schools with Capital Medical University in Beijing, China
 1984 - Made affiliations with sister schools with Shanghai University of Chinese Traditional Medicine in Shanghai,China
 1994 - Advanced emergency room is set up (First in Chūgoku region)
 2001 - Helicopter Emergency Medical Service started (First in Japan)
 2002 - Made Exchange agreement with Green College of University of Oxford
 2004 - Kawasaki Sukenobu Memorial Auditorium is set up

Organisation 

Medical school
Library
Central Research Center
Kawasaki Medical School Hospital
Kawasaki Hospital
Kawasaki Medical School Medical Museum
Graduate school

Related Schools 
Kawasaki University of Medical Welfare
Kawasaki College of Allied Health Professions
Kawasaki Vocational Schools of Rehabilitation
Kawasaki Senior High School Attached to Kawasaki Medical School

Medical Museum of Kawasaki Medical School
Kawasaki Medical School (川崎医科大学 Kawasaki ika daigaku) is a private university in Kurashiki, Okayama, Japan, established in Spring, 1970.
In this museum, the collected materials focus on  the exposition of modern medicine rather than on historical materials. Students are able to instruct themselves by examining the exhibited specimens and to solidify their understanding. Practicing physicians are also welcome to visit the museum to further their medical education. It is also designed  to propagate knowledge of medicine and health care to the general public.

Related People 
Takahara Shigeo - One‐time Professor who discovered Acatalasia

External links
 Official site
 Official site 
 Medical Museum

Educational institutions established in 1970
Private universities and colleges in Japan
Universities and colleges in Okayama Prefecture
Medical museums in Japan
Museums in Okayama Prefecture
Medical schools in Japan
1970 establishments in Japan
Kurashiki